The Latrobe River (or sometimes La Trobe or LaTrobe) is a perennial river of the West Gippsland catchment, located in the West Gippsland region of the Australian state of Victoria. The Latrobe River and its associated sub-catchment is an important source for the Gippsland Lakes, draining the south eastern slopes of the Great Dividing Range.

Course and features

The Latrobe River rises below Dick Hill, from the southern slopes of the Baw Baw plateau, part of the Great Dividing Range, between Powelltown and Noojee where it shares a watershed with the Little Yarra River, in a state forestry area. The river flows generally in an easterly direction, then south, and then east again through the Latrobe Valley, joined by seventeen tributaries including the Ada, Toorongo, Loch, Tanjil, Morwell, Tyers, and Thomson rivers, before reaching its mouth in Lake Wellington east of  where it forms its confluence with the Avon. The river descends  over its  course.

The Latrobe River flows through Lake Narracan, a storage reservoir near  built to supply cooling water for the nearby brown coal fired power stations, and through Lake Victoria before emptying into the Bass Strait. In its upper reaches, the Latrobe River flows adjacent to the Noojee Streamside Reserve and the Tyers Streamside Reserve. As the river reaches its mouth, it flows adjacent to The Lakes National Park and the Gippsland Lakes Coastal Park.

The Latrobe River sub-catchment area is managed by the West Gippsland Catchment Management Authority.

Etymology
In the Aboriginal Brataualung language the river is given two names, Durt'yowan, meaning "finger", and Tanjil, with no defined meaning.

According to Les Blake, in 1841 William Adams Brodribb, an early settler, named the river in honour of Charles La Trobe, Lieutenant Governor of the Port Phillip District. A. W. Reed also attributes Brodribb to naming the river in honour of La Trobe; yet Reed claims that the river was discovered by Angus McMillan in 1840 who named the watercourse as Glengarry River.

The Australian Government Gazetteer lists the name of the watercourse as La Trobe River and the river is sometimes spelled as LaTrobe River; meanwhile the Victorian Government Registrar of Geographic Names list the name as Latrobe River.

See also

 List of rivers of Australia

References

External links
 
 

West Gippsland catchment
Rivers of Gippsland (region)